Pazña Municipality is a municipality of the Poopó Province in the Oruro Department, Bolivia. Its capital is Pazña.

Government
Municipal governments in Bolivia are divided into executive and legislative branches. The Mayor of Pazña is the head of the city government, elected by general election for a term of five years. The Municipal Council is the legislative branch.

The current mayor of Pazña is Gualberto Abad Olmos Leaños of the National Unity Front, who took office in June 2010 following the resignation of Víctor Centeno (of the Movement for Socialism). A new mayor will be selected in a special election expected to be held in 2011.

Subdivision 
The municipality used to be divided into five cantons.
Pazña Canton
Totoral Canton
Peñas Canton
Avicaya Canton
Urmiri Canton

Languages 
The languages spoken in the Pazña Municipality are mainly Quechua, Spanish and Urus.

References

External links 
 Map of the Poopó Province

Municipalities of Oruro Department